Gerdau is a Brazilian steel company.

Gerdau may also refer to:

Geography
 Gerdau, Germany, a town in Germany
 Gerdau (river), a river in Germany

Other uses
 Gerdau (surname), a surname